Grand Lac Nominingue is a lake in Southwest Quebec, located in the Laurentian Mountains, bordering the village of Nominingue. It is connected to Petit Lac Nominingue through a river.

Lakes of Laurentides